The Bear Creek Motel is a historic motel on United States Route 65 in Bear Creek Springs, Arkansas.  It is a single T-shaped stone and concrete building, built in 1936 to replace a wood-framed tourist accommodation that had burned down.  The building has a distinctive wave-shaped concrete roof, intended to lure travelers off the road, and houses five guest rooms and an office.  The wave shape is continued in the guest rooms, which have barrel-vaulted ceilings, and are also finished in concrete and stone veneer.

The property was listed on the National Register of Historic Places in 2001.

See also
National Register of Historic Places listings in Boone County, Arkansas

References

Hotel buildings on the National Register of Historic Places in Arkansas
Buildings and structures completed in 1936
National Register of Historic Places in Boone County, Arkansas
1936 establishments in Arkansas
Stone buildings in the United States